The 2012 season for the  cycling team began in January at the Bay Classic Series. As a UCI ProTeam, they were automatically invited and obligated to send a squad to every event in the UCI World Tour.

The team formed for the 2012 season as part of a scheme to promote cycling talent in Australia, and not come into such difficulties suffered by another Australian team – Pegasus Sports – which folded without contesting a race due to sponsorship issues. Much of the team's ridership is Australian, almost entirely anglophone, and the team competes under an Australian licence; as such, becoming the first Australian team to be part of the top-tier of professional cycling. Its manager is Shayne Bannan, the former Performance Director of Cycling Australia, while team's senior Director Sportif is ex-professional road cyclist Matt White, who had a similar role at  before being sacked.

2012 roster
Ages as of 1 January 2012.

Riders' 2011 teams

One-day races
The week after the Bay Classic Series, the team swept the Australian national championships in Buninyong, Victoria, as Gerrans – one of 16 GreenEDGE riders in the race – won the road race title, and Durbridge won the time trial title ahead of team-mate Cameron Meyer.

Stage races
The team made its debut on New Year's Day, in the Bay Classic Series in Victoria, Australia. Davis won the men's classification racing for GreenEDGE's second team in the race, Mitchelton Wines/Lowe Farms.

In January, Gerrans won the Tour Down Under, giving the team an overall victory in its first World Tour event.

Season victories

Footnotes

References

2012 road cycling season by team
2012
2012 in Australian sport